The iron harvest is the annual collection of unexploded ordnance, barbed wire, shrapnel, bullets and congruent trench supports collected by Belgian and French farmers after ploughing their fields. The harvest generally consists of material from the First World War, which is still found in large quantities across the former Western Front.

Unexploded munitions

During World War I, an estimated one tonne of explosives was fired for every square metre of territory on the Western front.  As many as one in every four shells fired did not detonate.  In the Ypres Salient, an estimated 300 million projectiles that the British and the German forces fired at each other during World War I were duds, and most of them have not been recovered. According to its website, DOVO, the demining unit of the Belgian armed forces defused more than 200 tons of ammunition in 2019. 

Unexploded weapons—in the form of shells, bullets, and grenades—buried themselves on impact or were otherwise quickly swallowed in the mud. As time passes, construction work, field ploughing, and natural processes bring the rusting shells to the surface. Most of the iron harvest is found during the spring planting and autumn ploughing, as the regions of northern France and Flanders are rich agricultural areas. Farmers collect the munitions and place them along the boundaries of fields or other collection points for authorities.

Dangers
Despite their age, unexploded munitions remain very dangerous. The French Département du Déminage (Department of Mine Clearance) recovers about 900 tons of unexploded munitions every year. Since 1946, approximately 630 French ordnance disposal workers have died handling unexploded munitions. Two died handling munitions outside Vimy, France as recently as 1998, and in 2014 two Belgian construction workers were killed when they encountered an unexploded shell buried for a century.   Over 20 members of Belgian Explosive Ordnance Disposal (DOVO) have died disposing of First World War munitions since the unit was formed in 1919. In just the area around Ypres, 260 people have been killed and 535 have been injured by unexploded munitions since the end of the First World War. Shells containing poisonous gas remain viable and will corrode and release their gas content. Close to five percent of the shells fired during the First World War contained poisonous gas, and ordnance disposal experts continue to suffer burns from mustard gas shells that were split open.

Disposal
In Belgium, munitions and wartime iron harvested by farmers are carefully placed around field edges or in gaps in telegraph poles, where they are regularly collected by the Belgian army for disposal by controlled explosion at a specialist center in Poelkapelle. The depot was built after ocean dumping of shells stopped in 1980. Once extracted by the army, any gas chemicals are burned and destroyed at high temperatures at specialized facilities and the explosives detonated.

See also 
Bomb Harvest
 Zone Rouge

References

Further reading
Webster, D Aftermath: The Remnants of War Vintage Books 1999.

External links

 Rob Ruggenberg, The Abomination of Houthulst
 Rob Ruggenberg, Death Waits Patiently on a Belgian Beach
 Photo of the iron harvest
 Another photo of the iron harvest

Western Front (World War I)
Aftermath of World War I